The following is a list of people from Johnson County, Kansas.  Inclusion on the list is reserved for notable people who have resided in the rural county area or in smaller cities such as Leawood, Prairie Village, Stilwell, or De Soto.  For residents of the more populous Olathe and Overland Park, see list of people from Olathe, Kansas and list of people from Overland Park, Kansas.

List of people

 Stanley T. Adams (De Soto)
 John Anderson, Jr.
 Jeff Andra
 John Henry Balch
 Robert Frederick Bennett (Prairie Village)
 Lee Rogers Berger
 Matt Besler
 Terry Bivins
 Blair Butler
 John D. Carmack
 Stevie Case
 Johnny Dare
 Joyce DiDonato (Prairie Village)
 Dave Doeren
 Bart Evans
 Holley Fain (Leawood)
 Donald Fehr (Prairie Village)
 Jeffrey L. Fisher (Leawood)
 Catherine Fox
 Thomas Frank
 Matt Freije
 Matt Fulks
 Julie Garwood (Leawood)
 Lawrence Gates
 Howard K. Gloyd (De Soto)
 Matt Gogel
 Brian Gordon (Westwood)
 Debora Green (Prairie Village)
 Donald J. Hall, Sr.
 George H. Hodges
 Jennifer Hopkins
 Nick Jordan
 Jen Kao
 Steve Lacy
 Frank H. Lee (De Soto)
 Dave Lindstrom
 Steve Little
 Ashley Litton
 Eric Lynch
 Karen McCarthy (Leawood)
 Harold "Jug" McSpaden
 Candice Millard (Leawood)
 Dennis Moore
 Richard Myers
 Philip Nelson
 John H. Outland
 Ramesh Ponnuru (Prairie Village)
 Trevor Releford
 Rob Riggle
 Jim Roth (Prairie Village)
 Paul Rudd
 Paul Shirley
 Max Shortell
 Bubba Starling
 Michael R. Strain 
 William B. Strang Jr. 
 Jason Sudeikis
 Paul Turner
 Russell R. Waesche (Leawood)
 Kay Wolf (Prairie Village)
 David Wysong

See also

 Lists of people from Kansas

References

Johnson County